Adrienn Nagy (born 24 March 2001) is a Hungarian tennis player.

She has career-high WTA rankings of 515 in singles, achieved on 12 September 2022, and 245 in doubles, set on 26 September 2022.

Her mother Virág Csurgó also was a professional tennis player, she participated at the 1996 Summer Olympics.

Junior career

Junior Grand Slam performance 
Singles:

 Australian Open: 3R (2019)
 French Open: 1R (2018, 2019)
 Wimbledon: 1R (2018, 2019)
 US Open: 2R (2018, 2019)

Doubles:

 Australian Open: W (2019)
 French Open: SF (2019)
 Wimbledon: 2R (2019)
 US Open: SF (2019)

Nagy has a career-high ITF juniors ranking of 19, achieved on 28 January 2019.

She won the 2018 Orange Bowl in doubles with Park So-hyun and won the 2019 Australian Open on girls' doubles with Natsumi Kawaguchi.

In January 2020 Nagy went to the University of Texas, and played for the Texas Longhorns team until March 2020, when the NCAA season was interrupted due to the Coronavirus Pandemic.

ITF Circuit finals

Singles: 1 title

Doubles: 17 (6 titles, 11 runner-ups)

ITF Junior Circuit finals

Junior Grand Slam finals

Girls' doubles: 1 (title)

Other ITF Junior Circuit finals

Singles: 5 (3 titles, 2 runner–ups)

Doubles: 16 (12 titles, 4 runner–ups)

National representation

Fed Cup/Billie Jean King Cup
Nagy made her debut for the Hungary Fed Cup team in 2019, while the team was competing in the Europe/Africa Zone Group I.

Singles (1–0)

Doubles (1–0)

References

External links
 
 
 

2001 births
Living people
Hungarian female tennis players
Grand Slam (tennis) champions in girls' doubles
Australian Open (tennis) junior champions
Texas Longhorns women's tennis players
21st-century Hungarian women